Chris Greene may refer to:

 Chris Greene (broadcaster) (born 1988), Irish broadcaster and comedian
 Chris H. Greene, American physicist

See also
Christopher Greene (1737–1781), U.S. legislator and soldier
Christopher Becker Greene (1901–1944)
Chris Green (disambiguation)
Christopher Green (disambiguation)